Berrimah is an eastern suburb in the city of Darwin, in the Northern Territory of Australia.

History
Berrimah is on unceded lands of the Larrakia people.

Before World War II, the military authorities had decided on a number of locations in the north to identify strategic "camps" on "the road to the North" – "Berrimah", "Noonamah" and "Larrimah". The military board chose some local Aboriginal names. During that time Berrimah became a military and industrial area.

Leading up to the bombing of Darwin and in late 1941, action was being taken to erect quickly the 119th Australian General Hospital at the camp site to be known as "Berrimah", the Army quoting the origin of the Aboriginal word "to the south". The hospital was erected on the present day Kormilda College site and was then called "Berrimah".

The original road reserve between Sections 41 and 42, Hundred of Bagot, became known as Berrimah Road and by September 1952, this name was officially gazetted as the access road south of the main highway crossing to the quarantine station. The strafing of this hospital by Japanese war planes in 1942 led to its eventual removal to Adelaide River.

Not far away on the eastern side of Berrimah Road, a small cemetery reserve marked the graves of Japanese airmen who died in the earlier attempts to bomb Darwin into submission.

It is also the rough location of a concept known as the Berrimah Line, demarcation of inequitable resourcing towards the capital Darwin and surrounding areas, over the vast remote areas of the south.

Present day
Located within Berrimah are the Summer Institute of Linguistics, Kormilda College, Berrimah Power Station, CSIRO Wildlife Research Laboratory, Berrimah Research Farm Centre, Darwin Prison, Don Dale Youth Detention Centre, the Showground and Exhibition Centre.

Berrimah is a predominantly industrial area.

Population
According to the 2016 census of population, there were 789 people in Berrimah.
 Aboriginal and Torres Strait Islander people made up 38.0% of the population. 
 67.3% of people were born in Australia and 48.8% of people only spoke English at home.
 The most common response for religion was Christian 42.7%.

References

External links

https://web.archive.org/web/20070903185425/http://www.brmanagement.com.au/suburbsmap.html
http://203.84.234.220/Profile/Darwin/Default.aspx?id=146&pg=101&gid=120&type=enum

Suburbs of Darwin, Northern Territory